New Mesquite is an unincorporated community in Collin County, located in the U.S. state of Texas.

References

Unincorporated communities in Collin County, Texas
Unincorporated communities in Texas